Otis Floyd Lamson (September 13, 1876 – December 11, 1956) was an American football player and coach, and also a surgeon.

Early life
Lamson was born in Beetown, Wisconsin, in 1876.

Football career
Lamson served as the head football coach at the University of North Carolina at Chapel Hill in 1907. Prior to his coaching career, Lamson played college football while attending the University of Pennsylvania. He lettered for the Quakers in 1904 and 1905. In 1905, he earned All-American honors from Walter Camp. In 1906, Lamson was hired by the Massillon Tigers to play for the team in the "Ohio League" championship. During that two-game series, a betting scandal involving the Tigers and their rivals, the Canton Bulldogs, arose.

Head coaching record

Medical career
Lamson graduated from the University of Pennsylvania Medical School in 1907, after which he practiced medicine in Seattle for 41 years, until his retirement in 1952. He was one of the best-known surgeons in the western United States. After his internship at Mercy Hospital in Denver, he received a fellowship to work at the Mayo Clinic. He then served at Doctors Hospital and Columbus Hospital in Seattle. Lamson also served as the president of the North Pacific Surgical Association, and he co-founded the Pacific Coast Surgical Association. His professional interests included the treatment of achalasia.

References

Additional sources

External links

1876 births
1956 deaths
American surgeons
All-American college football players
American football tackles
Massillon Tigers players
North Carolina Tar Heels football coaches
Penn Quakers football players
People from Beetown, Wisconsin